Louisa Lula Greene Richards (April 8, 1849 – September 9, 1944) was a poet and was the first female periodical editor in Utah Territory. Richards's work was published under a variety of names, including Louisa L. Greene, Louise L. Green, Lula Green, and Lula G. Richards. She was a member of the Church of Jesus Christ of Latter-day Saints (LDS Church).

Early life and education
Louisa Lula Greene was born in Kanesville, Iowa, to Evan M. Greene (a son of John P. Greene) and Susan Kent. Lula was the eighth of their thirteen children. She was born during an outbreak of cholera. Throughout her life, she was a member of the LDS Church. Both of her grandmothers were sisters to LDS Church president Brigham Young. Her family moved to Kanesville in 1846. In 1852, they moved to Salt Lake City, Utah Territory, after Young evacuated Kanesville.

Greene began writing poetry as a young girl and there is evidence that she wrote poetry at age fourteen. From 1868 to 1869, Greene attended a private school in Salt Lake City. When Greene was 18, she and her sister began a small school in Cache County, Utah; however, Greene lacked patience with her students and did not have formal training. In 1869, she returned to school at the University of Deseret in Salt Lake City.

Career
In 1869, Greene was the editor of the Smithfield Sunday School Gazette, a small periodical issued to individuals who attended the LDS Church Sunday School in Smithfield for six issues from October to November. However, in 1871, she was required to return to Smithfield due to a family illness. Lacking the money she needed for the trip, Greene submitted a poem to the Salt Lake Daily Herald and asked editor Edward L. Sloan to buy it for $7.50, which was the amount of money she needed to return home. Sloan agreed, and her poem "Tired Out" was published on the front page of the Daily Herald.

Sloan soon contacted Greene in 1872 and asked her if she would be interested in being the editor of a newspaper for Latter-day Saint women called Woman's Exponent. Greene conferred with general Relief Society president Eliza R. Snow, and after receiving her blessing and the approval of Brigham Young, Greene accepted Sloan's offer. In 1872, Women's Exponent began publication in Salt Lake City with Greene as editor. Her name was printed as "L. L. Greene" in the first issue, but due to letters to the editor that assumed she was male, she changed her name to "Louise L. Greene" in subsequent issues. Greene edited the periodical until she was succeeded in 1877 by Emmeline B. Wells, who edited until Women's Exponent was discontinued in 1914. Greene requested to leave her position there due to responsibilities at home and to her family. However, she continued to contribute to the Exponent and other church publications.

In 1873, Greene married Levi Willard Richards, the son of Levi Richards and a nephew of church leader Willard Richards. Levi served in many positions in the LDS Church, including as a member of the general board of the Sunday School and as a patriarch. Lula and Levi had seven children, four of whom lived to adulthood.  One of their children was the artist Lee Greene Richards.

In 1883, Louisa Richards became an editor with the Juvenile Instructor, an LDS periodical edited by George Q. Cannon. She wrote and edited the column "Our Little Folks" until 1907, when it was discontinued. Richards wrote poetry, and her poems appeared in Woman’s Exponent, Juvenile Instructor, Improvement Era, Young Woman's Journal, Children’s Friend, and Relief Society Magazine.

Later life
Her husband, Levi, took a plural wife, Persis Louisa Young, who was Greene's niece. They were married on the eleventh anniversary of Lula and Levi's wedding. Persis stayed at the Richards' household and helped with chores. Levi died in 1914.

Richards continued to be an active member of the LDS Church. She helped with the Young Ladies' Mutual Improvement Association and the Relief Society. She was also called by the church to be a member of the General Board of the Primary, a position she held for twenty-five years. She worked in the Salt Lake Temple from its dedication in 1893 until 1934. She continued writing until her death. Richards died on September 9, 1944, in Salt Lake City.

Publications

Poetry

Fiction

References

External links
 
Article written about Louisa L. Greene Richards in The Young Woman's Journal
Poetry by Richards that appeared in the Relief Society Magazine

1849 births
1944 deaths
American Latter Day Saint writers
19th-century American poets
20th-century American poets
Latter Day Saint poets
American women poets
American print editors
Editors of Latter Day Saint publications
University of Utah alumni
People from Smithfield, Utah
Writers from Provo, Utah
Writers from Salt Lake City
People from Grantsville, Utah
Richards–Young family
American leaders of the Church of Jesus Christ of Latter-day Saints
American women journalists
20th-century American women writers
19th-century American women writers
Relief Society people
Primary (LDS Church) people
Latter Day Saints from Iowa
Latter Day Saints from Utah